Peter Bernhard Feuchtwanger (26 June 1930 – 18 June 2016) was a German pianist, composer, and teacher. He lived for many years in London.

Life and work 

Feuchtwanger was born in Munich as the son of a local bank director, Theodore Feuchtwanger (1858–1956). During World War II, the family fled to Haifa. Peter Feuchtwanger was a self-taught pianist who later developed exercises to help pianists learn a natural effortless technique. They also help pianists who have physical problems due to their approach to playing.

Feuchtwanger's piano teachers included Edwin Fischer and Walter Gieseking, but especially inspiring were the pianist Clara Haskil, who practiced on her concert tours in England with him, and the contralto Kathleen Ferrier. He broke early from a career as a pianist to devote himself to composition and music education. He was a follower of Zen and dealt with music and philosophy from India and the Arab world. His Variation on an Eastern Folk Tune (Books 1 and 2) won first prize at the Viotti International Music Competition in 1959.

He worked extensively with the American pianist and composer Carter Larsen the Argentine pianist Martha Argerich before her breakthrough in the Chopin Competition in 1965. In the same year, he helped Youra Guller's late comeback in London. He was one of pianist Issak Tavior's instructors. He also helped Shura Cherkassky to overcome his nerves; and coached David Helfgott. Yehudi Menuhin invited him in 1966 to write a work for Violin, Sitar, Tabla and Tanpura for the Bath International Music Festival. It was first performed by Menuhin and Ravi Shankar. In 2003, with Professor Günter Reinhold, he founded the International Academy of Music Education in Karlsruhe. He was Visiting Professor at the Yehudi Menuhin School in Surrey and at the Mozarteum University of Salzburg. He held part-time professorships at conservatoriums in Karlsruhe and Basel. From 1967, he gave Master Classes throughout the world. He developed a novel technique of piano playing, which led to the publication of special piano exercises.

Feuchtwanger died in his apartment in London, aged 85, survived by his partner, the artist Michael Garady. He was buried at the Brompton Cemetery.

References

External links
 Peter Feuchtwanger fan site
 Profile, Musik Bildung 
 
 Peter Feuchtwanger 1939–2016 – Pianist, Composer, Pedagogue, Frances Wilson, 18 June 2016
 EPTA-UK, European Piano Teachers Association, United Kingdom
London ArtsFest, Peter Feuchtwanger – Founding Director, Vice Chairman 4 April 2000 – 17 June 2016
Musical Pointers Peter Feuchtwanger Piano Exercises

1930 births
2016 deaths
Musicians from Munich
German classical pianists
Jewish classical pianists
Male classical pianists
English classical pianists
Burials at Brompton Cemetery
German emigrants to the United Kingdom